Massive! is a short-lived Saturday morning British television programme aimed at a "youth" audience. It ran for two seasons, each of 22 episodes, between 1995 and 1996. A spin-off from the children's Saturday morning show Scratchy and Co, Massive! was aimed at a slightly older audience, and was presented by Malcolm Jeffries and Denise van Outen.

One of the regular guests on the show was the horror-themed magician Simon Drake, who made a number of appearances on the show performing both sleight-of-hand tricks and larger illusions. One of these larger illusions, a sawing in half performed using van Outen as the assistant being sawed in half, drew a large number of viewer complaints due to the liberal use of fake blood, and the fact that van Outen was not restored into one piece before the show cut to a commercial break. Following an investigation of these complaints, the British television regulator, the ITC, warned the show's producers to moderate its content.

After the show's second season, it was cancelled due to low viewing figures, and some of its content incorporated into a revised version of Scratchy and Co.

ITV children's television shows
1990s British children's television series
1995 British television series debuts
1996 British television series endings